Irish Target Sports (ITS) is the Irish association for practical shooting under the International Practical Shooting Confederation. Founded in 2004 the region was provisionally accepted as an IPSC region in 2005 and definitively accepted in 2006. Irish Target Sports is affiliated to Irish Bullseye Sports (IBS) and the National Rifle Association of Ireland (NRAI).

See also 
 Northern Ireland Practical Shooting Confederation
 United Kingdom Practical Shooting Association

References 

Regions of the International Practical Shooting Confederation
Practical Shooting